The Midland Railway 780 Class was a class of 0-4-4T steam locomotives.  They were built by Dubs & Co. in 1870, and were very similar to the 690 Class.  Originally numbers 780–799.  They were double-framed engines with a back tank behind the cab under the bunker. They were all originally fitted with condensing apparatus for working the Metropolitan lines.

In 1898, Nos. 780–783 were transferred to the duplicate list as Nos 780A–783A. Their 1907 numbers were 1206–1225. No. 1212 was withdrawn in 1921, but the remaining 19 were inherited by the London, Midland and Scottish Railway at the Grouping in 1923. They were all withdrawn, and were extinct by 1935.

References 

 An Illustrated Review of Midland Locomotives Volume 3 - Tank Engines by R. J. Essery & D. Jenkinson 

0-4-4T locomotives
0780 Class
Railway locomotives introduced in 1870
Dübs locomotives